The 2018–19 Southeastern Conference men's basketball season began with practices in October 2018, followed by the start of the 2018–19 NCAA Division I men's basketball season in November. Conference play started in early January 2019 and will end in March, after which 14 member teams will participate in the 2019 SEC tournament at Bridgestone Arena in Nashville, Tennessee. The tournament champion is guaranteed a selection to the 2019 NCAA tournament.

Preseason

Preseason All-America teams

Preseason polls

Media Day Selections

() first place votes

Preseason All-SEC teams

 Media select a five-member first team; coaches select an eight-member first team
 Players in bold are media choices for SEC Player of the Year; coaches do not select a preseason Player of the Year

Head coaches

Note: Stats shown are before the beginning of the season. Overall and SEC records are from time at current school.

Rankings

Regular season

Big 12/SEC Challenge

SEC regular season
This table summarizes the head-to-head results between teams in conference play. Results updated through January 5, 2019.

Records against other conferences

Regular season

Postseason

SEC Tournament

 March 13–17 at the Bridgestone Arena, Nashville. Teams will be seeded by conference record, with ties broken by record between the tied teams followed by record against the regular-season champion, if necessary.

Honors and awards

All-SEC Awards

Coaches

Players

AP

NBA draft

References